Salem is the seat of Salem Municipality, Stockholm County, Sweden. Statistically it is a part of the bimunicipal contiguously built-up Tumba urban area.

In 2005, Salem had a population of 14,171. The number of inhabitants increased to ca. 16,000 in 2008, and to almost 17,000 in 2020 .

Notable people
 
 
Edoff Andersson (1902–1934), Swedish politician and trade unionist

References

Municipal seats of Stockholm County
Swedish municipal seats
Populated places in Salem Municipality